Cyperus cuspidatus, commonly known as the coastal plain flatsedge, is a sedge of the family Cyperaceae that is native to seasonally dry tropical areas of Africa, Asia, the Americas and Australia.

Description
In Australia it blooms between February and August producing green-yellow-brown flowers. The plant has a slender root system. It has linear shaped leaf blades that can be flat or rolled that taper to a pointed end.

Taxonomy
The species was described by the botanist Carl Sigismund Kunth in 1816 as a part of the work Nova genera et species plantarum authored by Kunth, Aimé Bonpland and Alexander von Humboldt. It has a total of 18 synonyms including; Cyperus angustifolius, Cyperus gratus, Cyperus recurvus, Cyperus waterlotii and Dichostylis cuspidata. The type specimen was collected by von Humboldt and Bonpland in Venezuela in 1800.

Distribution
In Australia it is found in Queensland, the Northern Territory and it is found along creeks, streams and rivers in the Kimberley region of Western Australia where it grows in stony red sand-loam soils over sandstone. In Asia it is found from Pakistan in the west to China in the east and extends down into Malesia. It is found in southern parts of North America extending through Central America and in northern parts of South America.

See also
List of Cyperus species

References

cuspidatus
Taxa named by Carl Sigismund Kunth
Plants described in 1816
Flora of Western Australia
Flora of the Northern Territory
Flora of Queensland
Flora of Pakistan
Flora of India
Flora of Alabama
Flora of Angola
Flora of Assam (region)
Flora of Bangladesh
Flora of Benin
Flora of Bolivia
Flora of Borneo
Flora of Botswana
Flora of Brazil
Flora of Burkina Faso
Flora of Burundi
Flora of Cambodia
Flora of the Central African Republic
Flora of Chad
Flora of China
Flora of Colombia
Flora of the Republic of the Congo
Flora of Cuba
Flora of El Salvador
Flora of Ethiopia
Flora of Florida
Flora of French Guiana
Flora of Gabon
Flora of the Gambia
Flora of Georgia (U.S. state)
Flora of Guyana
Flora of Guinea
Flora of Ghana
Flora of Guinea-Bissau
Flora of Hainan
Flora of Honduras
Flora of Ivory Coast
Flora of Java
Flora of Kenya
Flora of Laos
Flora of Liberia
Flora of Madagascar
Flora of Malawi
Flora of Malaysia
Flora of Mali
Flora of Mauritania
Flora of Mauritius
Flora of Mexico
Flora of Mozambique
Flora of Namibia
Flora of Nepal
Flora of Niger
Flora of Nigeria
Flora of Peru
Flora of the Philippines
Flora of Senegal
Flora of Sierra Leone
Flora of Somalia
Flora of South Carolina
Flora of Sri Lanka
Flora of Sudan
Flora of Sulawesi
Flora of Suriname
Flora of Swaziland
Flora of Taiwan
Flora of Tanzania
Flora of Thailand
Flora of Tibet
Flora of Togo
Flora of Uganda
Flora of Venezuela
Flora of Vietnam
Flora of Zambia
Flora of Zimbabwe
Flora of the Democratic Republic of the Congo